Amanab is a Papuan language spoken by 4,400 people in Amanab District, Sandaun Province, Papua New Guinea.

Dialects are Eastern, Northern, and Western.

Phonology

Vowels

Consonants

Pronouns
The Amanab pronouns are:

{| 
!  !! singular !! dual !! plural
|-
! 1excl
| ka || ka-ningri || ka-ger
|-
! 1incl
|  || bi-ningri || bi-ger
|-
! 2
| ne || ne-ningri || ne-nger
|-
! 3
| ehe || ehe-ningri || ehe-nger
|}

Syntax
In Amanab, subordinate clauses are linked using the topic marker suffix -ba.

References

Border languages (New Guinea)
Languages of Sandaun Province